Rajiv Dixit (30 November 1967 – 30 November 2010) was an Indian activist who promoted ayurveda and opposed allopathic medicine and opposed multi-national corporations.

He completed his elementary and middle school education in Faizabad. In 1994 he went to Allahabad for higher education, but became an activist before completing his education.Rajiv Dixit was the national secretary of Bharat Swabhiman Trust.

Career 
Dixit founded the "Azadi Bachao Andolan" (Save Freedom Movement) in the early 1990s as a campaign to protect Indian industries, at a time when multi-national corporations were increasing their presence in India as a part of a trend towards globalisation. An aide to Ramdev, Dixit served as the national secretary of Ramdev's anti-corruption organisation Bharat Swabhiman Andolan.

During his career as an activist, Dixit demanded decentralisation of the Indian taxation system, stating that the existing system was the core reason for bureaucratic corruption. He claimed that 80 percent of tax revenue was used to pay the salaries of politicians and bureaucrats and compared the modern budget system of the Indian government to the earlier British budget system in India.
He tried to bring educational reforms in India.

Death 
Dixit died on 30 November 2010 in Bhilai, Chhattisgarh. After a lecture at Bemetra in Durg, he was accompanied by Daya Sagar, a local Bharat Swabhiman Andolan officer, while driving to Bhilai. During the trip he felt uncomfortable and sweated.   At Daya Sagar's residence, he fell down in the bathroom. Initially he insisted on not going to the doctor. After a call from Baba Ramdev, he was first taken to Sector 9 Hospital in Bhilai and then transferred to the BSR Apollo Hospital. According to Dr. Dilip Ratnani, he died of a massive heart attack at night between 1 and 2 AM. On Dec 1, his body was sent by air to Aligarh without an autopsy. His body was displayed at Patanjali Yogapita and later cremated with mukhagni lit by his brother Pradip Dixit and Baba Ramdev. Later the Prime Minister's Office ordered an investigation into his death in 2019.

There is a belief among his followers that he was poisoned to death because of his movement against multinational companies in India and other countries. Some of his supporters claimed foul play by Baba Ramdev, but Ramdev dismissed the claims

See also

 Khadi 
 Khadi and Village Industries Commission
 List of unsolved deaths
 Make In India 
 National Charkha Museum  
 Sarvodaya
 Standup India
 Startup India
 Swadeshi Jagaran Manch
 Swaraj

References

1967 births
2010 deaths
Activists from Uttar Pradesh
Swadeshi activists
Unsolved deaths
Writers from Allahabad